Roberto Carpio Nicolle (16 July 1930 – 24 February 2022) was a Guatemalan politician who served as Vice President of Guatemala from 14 January 1986 to 14 January 1991 in the cabinet of president Vinicio Cerezo. He was a member of DCG.

Before his election as Vice President, Carpio served as the President of the National Constituent Assembly from 1984 to January 1986.

Carpio died in Guatemala City on 24 February 2022, at the age of 91.

References 

1930 births
2022 deaths
Guatemalan Christian Democracy politicians
People from Guatemala City
Vice presidents of Guatemala
Presidents of Central American Parliament